On 31 December 1980, New Year's Eve, a bomb exploded in The Norfolk Hotel in Nairobi, Kenya. It partially destroyed the hotel, killing 20 people and wounding another 87.

The owner of the hotel was a prominent member of the local Jewish community, and it has been suggested that the attack was in retaliation for Kenya providing support to rescue the Israeli hostages in Uganda during Operation Entebbe four years earlier. Among the dead were at least four Kenyans, two Americans, two British children, a Danish employee of KLM, a Frenchman, and a Belgian child. The bomber was said by the Kenyan government to be a Moroccan with a Maltese passport named Qaddura Mohammed Abd Al-Hamid, identified as a member of the Popular Front for the Liberation of Palestine (PFLP) who departed on a flight to Saudi Arabia on the day of the bombing.

References

1980 murders in Kenya
1980 hotel bombing
Antisemitic attacks and incidents
Antisemitism in Africa
Attacks during the New Year celebrations
Attacks on hotels in Africa
Hotel bombings
December 1980 crimes
Improvised explosive device bombings in 1980
1980 hotel bombing
Mass murder in 1980
1980 hotel bombing
Popular Front for the Liberation of Palestine attacks
Terrorist attacks attributed to Palestinian militant groups
Terrorist incidents in Africa in 1980
Terrorist incidents in Kenya in the 1980s
1980 hotel bombing
20th-century mass murder in Africa